Emanuel Crețulescu (born 17 June 1992) is a Romanian football player, currently playing for FC Zagon. He is a product of FC Brașov football school. He made his professional debut on 15 May 2011, in a Liga I match against Pandurii Târgu Jiu.

References

1992 births
Living people
Sportspeople from Brașov
Romanian footballers
FC Brașov (1936) players
Liga I players
Association football defenders